
Gmina Choszczno is an urban-rural gmina (administrative district) in Choszczno County, West Pomeranian Voivodeship, in north-western Poland.

Villages
Apart from the town of Choszczno, Gmina Choszczno contains the villages and settlements of Baczyn, Bonin, Brzostno, Chełpa, Czernice, Czyżewka, Gleźno, Golcza, Gostyczyn, Kleszczewo, Kołki, Koplin, Korytowo, Krzowiec, Łaszewo, Nowe Żeńsko, Oraczewice, Pakość, Piasecznik, Płoki, Przywodzie, Radaczewo, Radlice, Raduń, Roztocze, Rudniki, Rudnisko, Rzecko, Rzeczki, Skrzypiec, Sławęcin, Smoleń, Stary Klukom, Stawin, Stradzewo, Sulechówek, Sulino, Suliszewo, Sułowo, Szczepanka, Wardyń, Witoszyn, Wysokie, Zamęcin, Zwierzyn and Zwierzynek.

Neighbouring gminas
Gmina Choszczno is bordered by the gminas of Bierzwnik, Dolice, Drawno, Krzęcin, Pełczyce, Recz and Suchań.

References
Polish official population figures 2006

Choszczno
Choszczno County